Lutfar Rahman Farooq Bhuiyan is a politician from Faridpur District of Bangladesh. He was elected a member of parliament from Faridpur-5 in 1986 Bangladeshi general election.

Career 
Lutfar Rahman Farooq was elected a Member of Parliament from Faridpur-5 constituency as an Bangladesh Awami League candidate in the 1986 Bangladeshi general election. He was the chairman of Bhanga upazila. He died.

References 

Awami League politicians
3rd Jatiya Sangsad members
Year of birth missing
Year of death missing
People from Faridpur District